Pinchas Hacohen Peli (
6 May 1930 – 3 April 1989) was an Israeli modern Orthodox rabbi, essayist, poet, and scholar of Judaism and Jewish philosophy.

Early life

He was born in Jerusalem, Israel in 1930 to a Hasidic family named Hacohen. 

At age 16, he started publishing poetry in the Israeli newspaper Davar. He used the pen name "Peli" ("wonder") because he was afraid to use his real name, given that his family was a distinguished rabbinical family living in Jerusalem's ultra-Orthodox neighborhood of Mea Shearim. He subsequently adopted it as his actual name.

Peli received a B.A in Jewish History and Talmud at the Hebrew University of Jerusalem, and became a strong supporter of Religious Zionism.

Academic career

He was Professor of Jewish Thought and Literature at the Ben-Gurion University of the Negev, and a visiting professor at Yeshiva University, Cornell University, Notre Dame University, the Seminario Rabbinico in Argentina, and the Makuya Bible Seminary in Japan.

He was also the editor of the Encyclopaedia Judaica Year Book, the Jerusalem Quarterly for Literature, and Panim-el-Panim ("Face to Face"), and served as the Torah Commentator for the Jerusalem Post.

His writings include studies of the thought of rabbis Abraham Joshua Heschel and Joseph B. Soloveitchik, discussions concerning Shabbat, the Land of Israel, anti-Semitism, the problem of evil, and commentary on the weekly Torah portion (parsha).

Interfaith activity
Frequently lecturing to both Jews and Christians, he participated in the Israel Interfaith Committee and discussed Jewish-Catholic relations at the Vatican.

Friendship with Joseph B. Soloveitchik
While a professor at Yeshiva University between 1967 and 1971, he became a friend and important disciple of Rabbi Joseph B. Soloveitchik, publishing a volume based on his oral discourses entitled On Repentance
(Hebrew "Al haTeshuva", Jerusalem 1979), redacting the major points of Soloveitchik's teachings.
See .

Views
Peli opposed efforts to impose greater religious control over life in Israel. He told an interviewer in 1986, "I think for the sake of religion and for the sake of Israel there must be a separation between state and religion."

Family
Peli married his cousin Penina Cohen, whom he met in 1951 when he went to the United States as emissary of the Jewish Agency, lecturing on behalf of the Synagogue Council of America and the Israel Bonds organization.

They raised four children: 
 Dr. Bitkha Har-Shefi, lecturer of Talmud at Hebrew Union College
 Emuna Elon, Israeli author and journalist, who is married to Rabbi Binyamin Elon
 Bat-Sheva Peli-Seri, active in Kolech, the Israeli Religious Women's Forum
 Deuell Peli, a lawyer

Peli died in Jerusalem on 3 April 1989, and is buried in Jerusalem's Mount of Olives Jewish Cemetery.

Works
 Abraham Joshua Heschel: An intellectual Biography (New York University Press, 1986)
 Torah Today: A Renewed Encounter With Scripture, (1987)
 Shabbat Shalom: A Renewed Encounter with the Sabbath, (1988)
 Chapters in Jewish Thought in the Land of Israel, (1990)
 (ed.) On Repentance: The Thought and Oral Discourses of Rabbi Joseph Dov Soloveitchik (1980)

References

External links 
 https://www.nytimes.com/1989/04/04/obituaries/pinchas-h-peli-59-dies-in-israel-noted-author-and-judaic-scholar.html
 https://web.archive.org/web/20051118163830/http://www.kolel.org/pages/parasha/commentator.html#Anchor-Rabbi-49425

1930 births
1989 deaths
Israeli Modern Orthodox rabbis
Israeli male poets
Academic staff of Ben-Gurion University of the Negev
Yeshiva University faculty
Cornell University faculty
University of Notre Dame faculty
Hebrew University of Jerusalem alumni
Philosophers of Judaism
Holocaust theology
Religious Zionist Orthodox rabbis
Rabbis in Jerusalem
20th-century Israeli poets